Jan Johannes Anthony Arnoldus Vreede (19 January 1900 Zaandam – 17 February 1989, Amsterdam) was a sailor from the Netherlands, who represented his native country at the 1924 Summer Olympics in Paris, France. With helmsman Joop Carp and fellow crew member Anthonij Guépin, crewing the Dutch boat Willem Six, Vreede took the Bronze in the 6 Metre.

References

External links 
 

1900 births
1989 deaths
Dutch male sailors (sport)
Olympic sailors of the Netherlands
Olympic bronze medalists for the Netherlands
Olympic medalists in sailing
Sailors at the 1924 Summer Olympics – 6 Metre
Sportspeople from Zaanstad
Medalists at the 1924 Summer Olympics
20th-century Dutch people